Yalım is a common Turkish given name. In Turkish, "Yalım" means "Blade", "Flame", and/or "Sky Glow".

Real People

 Yalım Erez, politician in Tansu Çiller's government.

Turkish masculine given names